Ngawang Lekshey Gyaltso (born 1977 in Kalimpong, India) is the 15th in the lineage of Changling Rinpoches. His lineage was started by Rechung Dorje Drakpa, who lived in eleventh century Tibet.

Recognition
In 1985, Khabje Dilgo Khyentse Rinpoche and Khabje Penor Rinpoche recognized Changling Rinpoche as the main tulku of Changchub Ling Monastery in the Ü-Tsang region of Central Tibet. The news came to Rinpoche’s family in Kalimpong via a letter written by the Khabjes.

Rinpoche’s grandmother, surprised by the news, took it upon herself to look into the situation. She traced the source to an old yogi, Lama Trakden, a student of the previous Changling Lingpa. Lama Trakden had gone to see Khyentse Rinpoche who was giving teachings in Mysore at Penor Rinpoche’s monastery and requested him to recognize the tulku of his root teacher. This is how it came about that both Khyentse Rinpoche and Penor Rinpoche made the recognition together.

Studies
As an 11-year-old boy, Rinpoche entered Shechen Monastery and was enthroned by Khyentse Rinpoche and ordained by Trulshik Rinpoche. In the first year Rinpoche learned how to read and write Tibetan. The following year Shechen opened its philosophical college and Khyentse Rinpoche put Changling Tulku into the program when he was twelve, an age considerably younger than usual. When Rinpoche was fifteen, his root teacher Khyentse Rinpoche died. At age sixteen Rinpoche began to give teachings to others students in college. At eighteen Shechen Rabjam Rinpoche, abbot of Shechen Monastery, sent Changling Rinpoche to complete his studies of the Heart Sutra under the tutelage of the great khenpos of Penor Rinpoche’s college in Mysore. Rinpoche took full monk’s ordination at age twenty with Trulshik Rinpoche. Rinpoche graduated with a khenpo degree at the age of twenty-one.

Career
Since the death of Dilgo Khyentse Rinpoche, Rinpoche’s main tutors are Khabjes Trulshik Rinpoche, Dodrupchen Rinpoche, Penor Rinpoche, Taklung Tsetrul Rinpoche and Shechen Rabjam Rinpoche. Rinpoche teaches the senior students at Shechen College and those in a traditional three-year retreat, and teaches ritual and Nyingma tantra to senior students.

In previous years Changling Rinpoche was in charge of a section of the Shechen Monastery called dratsang, "the collection of monks".  He has been a director of Shechen Monastery.  Currently he is devoting his time to writing commentaries on the works of Dilgo Khyentse Rinpoche and searching out missing texts of the Northern Treasure Lineage. As the abbot of the Sechen Monastery shedra (monastic college), he holds a post previously held by such lamas as Mipham Rinpoche, Shechen Gyaltsap and Khenpo Gangshar.

Foreign travel
Rinpoche was warmly received when he began to travel and teach outside of Nepal, starting with Australia in 2002. His youthful enthusiasm combined with his knowledge of Buddhist doctrine and command of English language added to his appeal. He began to teach in Australia, in North America in 2004 and in Europe in 2005. His activities in Canada are currently centered in Vancouver, Victoria, Sechelt and Vancouver Island in British Columbia. In the United States he has visited both coasts: Santa Cruz, California, and the New York area. In 2008 he also visited Halifax, Berkeley, Boston, and Atlanta. In 2010 the Canadian and United States organizations of the Northern Treasures lineage hosted a visit by the rebirth of his teacher, Dilgo Khyentse Rinpoche.

See also
 Changling Rinpoche

References

External links
 Lotus Speech Australia page on Changling Rinpoche
 Lotus Speech Canada page on Changling Rinpoche
 Lotus Speech USA page on Changling Rinpoche

1977 births
Living people
Tibetan Buddhist spiritual teachers